Peter Bondra (born 7 February 1968) is a Ukrainian-born Slovak former professional ice hockey player. He was the general manager of the Slovakia national team from 2007 to 2011. A two-time 50-goal scorer, Bondra became the 37th player in National Hockey League (NHL) history to score 500 NHL goals; he is one of five eligible 500-goal players not currently in the Hockey Hall of Fame. He has the fewest points among all players who reached that milestone, with 892, making him one of only two (with Maurice Richard) 500-goal scorers not on the list of NHL players with 1,000 points. He is one of the few players who scored five or more goals in one NHL game.

Life and family
Bondra's father (a Rusyn) had moved to Lutsk from Jakubany, Czechoslovakia, when he was 16, and where he met his wife (a Pole). The parents moved with Peter and his two older brothers, Juraj and Vladimír, to Poprad when Peter was three years old. His father died in 1982.

Bondra was a Soviet citizen when he arrived in the United States, later obtaining a Slovak passport and citizenship in 1993 before the start of the 1994 Winter Olympics qualifying tournament. After living in Crofton, Maryland, Bondra resides in Riva with his wife Luba, their daughter Petra, and their sons David and Nick. He has participated in multiple alumni games and appearances with the current Capitals organization. His son David is a forward of Bratislava Capitals and also plays for Slovak national team, similarly to his father. His other son, Nick, began his collegiate career at Amherst College in 2017.

Playing career

Early career
Bondra played one season for HK Poprad in the lower ranks of Czechoslovak league competition, and transferred to VSŽ Košice in the First Division at the age of 18. His older brother Juraj also played there on defense, having already won one championship title with the team the year before. As early as his second season with Košice, Peter was considered one of the top shooters in the Czechoslovak league, and won the league championship together with his brother in 1988.

National Hockey League
Bondra was drafted by the Washington Capitals in the 1990 NHL Entry Draft, 156th overall. Before joining the Capitals, he played for TJ VSŽ Košice (now called HC Košice) for four seasons from 1986 to 1990 in Czechoslovakia. In Washington, Bondra became one of the more prolific goal-scorers of the 1990s. Due to the language barrier, he became good friends with Ukrainian-born Capitals player Dmitri Khristich, with whom he conversed in both Russian and Ukrainian. His deepest playoff run came in 1997–98, when the Capitals advanced to the Stanley Cup Finals before being swept by the Detroit Red Wings. In the 2003–04 season, Bondra's 14th with Washington, the Capitals endured a disappointing year and in a salary purge move traded veteran members of the team to contenders. As a result, Bondra was traded to the Ottawa Senators for Brooks Laich and a second round draft pick. At the press conference announcing this trade, Bondra notably broke into tears.

In 14 years with the Capitals, Bondra scored 472 goals and racked up 353 assists in 961 games. He holds the Capitals team records in short-handed goals (32). With Washington, he appeared in five All-Star Games (1993, 1996, 1997, 1998 and 1999). In 1997 and 1999, Bondra won the Fastest Skater Competition on All-Star weekend. In 2004, the Capitals held a vote for fans to determine the top 30 players in franchise history to celebrate their 30th season in the league. Bondra finished second with 2,018 votes. The winner, Olaf Kölzig, beat him by only 20 votes.

During the 1994–95 (with 34 in a lockout-shortened season) and 1997–98 seasons (with 52), Bondra led the league in goals scored, although the Maurice "Rocket" Richard Trophy for most goals scored in a season did not exist until the 1998–99 season.

After the 2004–05 NHL season was canceled due to the NHL labor dispute, Bondra played a handful of games with HK Tatravagónka ŠKP Poprad of the Slovak Extraliga. Prior to the 2005–06 season, Bondra was in talks to rejoin the Capitals, though he ended up signing with the Atlanta Thrashers for one season.

On 10 December, Bondra signed a one-year contract with the Chicago Blackhawks. On 22 December 2006, he scored his 500th NHL career goal at the United Center, in Chicago's 3–1 victory against the Toronto Maple Leafs. Bondra drove to the net and netted the rebound of Jassen Cullimore's shot from the left point past Toronto's Jean-Sébastien Aubin, 6:37 into the third period on the power play. Bondra was the 37th player in league history to reach the 500-goal mark and the fourth player to record his 500th goal in a Blackhawks sweater, joining Bobby Hull, Stan Mikita and Michel Goulet.

On 29 October 2007, Bondra announced his retirement from professional hockey at the age of 39. Since retirement, Bondra has represented Colosseo USA, a Slovak company that makes custom video scoreboards.

International play

Bondra has represented Slovakia on seven occasions in international competition, including the 1994 Winter Olympics qualifying tournament, the 1998 Winter Olympics, the 2006 Winter Olympics, the 1996 World Cup of Hockey and the Ice Hockey World Championship in 2002 and 2003. He scored a tournament-leading seven goals (including the tournament-winning goal) and ranked third among all players with nine points to lead Slovakia 4–3 over Russia to the gold medal at the 2002 World Championship. He notched five points (three goals, two assists) in eight games to help Slovakia earn the bronze medal at the 2003 World Championship. Overall, he played 47 games and scored 35 goals for Slovakia.

Career statistics

Regular season and playoffs

International

Awards and honours

See also
 List of NHL players with 1,000 games played
 List of NHL players with 500 goals
 List of players with five or more goals in an NHL game

References

External links
 
 
 
 

1968 births
Living people
Sportspeople from Lutsk
Atlanta Thrashers players
Chicago Blackhawks players
Detroit Vipers players
HC Košice players
HK Poprad players
Ice hockey players at the 1998 Winter Olympics
Ice hockey players at the 2006 Winter Olympics
IIHF Hall of Fame inductees
National Hockey League All-Stars
Olympic ice hockey players of Slovakia
Ottawa Senators players
Slovak ice hockey right wingers
Slovak people of Polish descent
Washington Capitals draft picks
Washington Capitals players
Slovak people of Rusyn descent
Soviet emigrants to Czechoslovakia
Soviet expatriate ice hockey players
Czechoslovak expatriate ice hockey people
Czechoslovak expatriate sportspeople in the United States
Slovak expatriate ice hockey players in the United States
Slovak expatriate ice hockey players in Canada
Soviet expatriate sportspeople in the United States